Sydney Alton Eugene Sorton (born 2 July 1947) is a politician from Saba, who currently holds the office of acting-judge with the Joint Court of Justice. Before this, Sorton was the lieutenant governor of Saba on two occasions, serving from 2 November 1989 to 19 November 1998 and from 1 April 2006 to 2 July 2008. Prior to that, Sorton was a law enforcement civil servant for the Netherlands Antilles Police Force.

References

1946 births
Living people
Dutch Antillean judges
Lieutenant Governors of Saba